Poy Char  is a khum (commune) of Phnom Srok District in Banteay Meanchey Province in western Cambodia.

Villages

 Paoy Snuol
 Paoy Char
 Trapeang Thma Tboung
 Trapeang Thma Cheung
 Trapeang Thma Kandal
 Paoy Ta Ong
 Sambuor
 Pongro

References

Communes of Banteay Meanchey province
Phnom Srok District